Theo Timmer (born 6 March 1949) is a former Grand Prix motorcycle road racer from the Netherlands. He had his best season in 1981 when he won the Czechoslovakian Grand Prix and finished the season in second place, behind Ricardo Tormo. In 1972 and 1973 he was third in the championship. He built most of his own motorcycles. Jan Thiel and Martin Mijwaart were his teachers. The engine marks he used were Jamathi, Kreidler, Bultaco, Casal and Morbidelli. He was twice national champion.

References 

1949 births
Living people
Dutch motorcycle racers
50cc World Championship riders
80cc World Championship riders
Sportspeople from Amsterdam